The 2nd Northwest Territories Legislative Council was the 9th assembly of the territorial government, lasting from the election of 1954 until dissolution in 1957. A total of four elected members and five appointed members comprised this council.

Radio broadcasts
John Parker made national news, bringing the attention of the council to radio broadcasts from Radio Moscow that were being received with greater clarity in most of the Northwest Territories than broadcasts from the Canadian Broadcasting Corporation. Parker emphasized the danger of northern residents falling victim to the communist propaganda, as most of the Inuit did not yet identify Canada as a nation, and other northern residents being susceptible with the limited media coverage that was available in the north at the time.

Reforms
Commissioner Robert Gordon Robertson, who had been recently appointed in the last session, made two critical reforms to the way council operated in this session that had lasting implications. The first reform was introduced at the first session held in the Elks Hall at Yellowknife. The amendment to the Rules in Council permitted members of Council to make a reply to the speech from the throne.

The second reform had to do with the Commissioner's lack of Executive Council. Robertson started putting out references for advice to council members to help guide him on critical issues of the day facing the territories. He wanted an Executive Council to advise him as the Lieutenant Governors had prior to 1897 had, and this method was the closest he could to achieve that.

Legislation
The first Legislative Session took place in the basement of the Elks Hall in Yellowknife in the spring of 1954. A total of nine bills were passed, mostly amendments to existing legislation. The second session held in Ottawa saw a total of seventeen bills passed.

The biggest issue dealt with during this session was the question relating to sales of liquor for Indians and Inuit which had been prohibited under a Northwest Territories law dating back to the Temporary North-West Council. The prohibition meant that bootlegging was commonplace, as was consumption of alternate forms of alcohol such as shoe polish, antifreeze and vanilla extract, resulting in needless deaths and endemic social issues. After debate the council agreed to change the regulations to allow liquor privileges to be the same for everyone. The federal government, however, disagreed and vetoed the changes.

References

External links
Northwest Territories Legislative Assembly homepage

Northwest Territories Legislative Assemblies